Plowed is an EP by the Minneapolis-based noise rock band Cows, released in 1992 by Amphetamine Reptile Records.

Track listing

Personnel 
Adapted from the Plowed liner notes.

Cows
 Thor Eisentrager – guitar
 Norm Rogers – drums
 Kevin Rutmanis – bass guitar
 Shannon Selberg – vocals, bugle

Production and additional personnel
 Adolphe Builha – engineering
 Cows – production
 David B. Livingstone – production

Release history

References

External links 
 

1992 EPs
Albums produced by Iain Burgess
Amphetamine Reptile Records EPs
Cows (band) albums